Gibson is a town in Gibson County, Tennessee, United States. The population was 396 at the 2010 census.

Geography

Demographics

As of the census of 2000, there were 305 people, 114 households, and 84 families residing in the town. The population density was 560.7 people per square mile (218.1/km2). There were 131 housing units at an average density of 240.8 per square mile (93.7/km2). The racial makeup of the town was 91.80% White, 4.59% African American, 1.97% Native American, 0.33% Asian, and 1.31% from two or more races.

There were 114 households, out of which 36.8% had children under the age of 18 living with them, 61.4% were married couples living together, 10.5% had a female householder with no husband present, and 26.3% were non-families. 16.7% of all households were made up of individuals, and 7.0% had someone living alone who was 65 years of age or older. The average household size was 2.68 and the average family size was 3.07.

In the town, the population was spread out, with 27.2% under the age of 18, 9.8% from 18 to 24, 31.8% from 25 to 44, 21.0% from 45 to 64, and 10.2% who were 65 years of age or older. The median age was 34 years. For every 100 females, there were 89.4 males. For every 100 females age 18 and over, there were 88.1 males.

The median income for a household in the town was $34,792, and the median income for a family was $35,000. Males had a median income of $36,250 versus $26,250 for females. The per capita income for the town was $11,966. About 13.6% of families and 11.9% of the population were below the poverty line, including 18.5% of those under the age of eighteen and none of those 65 or over.

Media
 WTPR-AM 710 "The Greatest Hits of All Time"

See also

 List of towns in Tennessee

References

External links

Towns in Gibson County, Tennessee
Towns in Tennessee